Løten is a municipality in Innlandet county, Norway. It is located in the traditional district of Hedemarken. The administrative centre of the municipality is the village of Løten. Other villages in the municipality include Ådalsbruk, Heimdal, and Brenneriroa.

The  municipality is the 246th largest by area out of the 356 municipalities in Norway. Løten is the 133rd most populous municipality in Norway with a population of 7,715.

General information
The parish of Løiten was established as a municipality on 1 January 1838 (see formannskapsdistrikt law). The name was later changed to Løten. The boundaries of the municipality have never changed.

Name
The municipality (originally the parish) is named after an old Løten farm. The actual farm is probably the one which is now called Prestgarden (meaning "the vicarage"), where the first Løten Church was built. (There is a long depression between the Prestgarden and the old church.) From about 1500 until 1838 the name was written "Leuten" or "Leuthen". From 1838 until 1918 the name was written "Løiten". It has been spelled "Løten" since 1918.

Coat of arms
The coat of arms was granted on 7 September 1984. The arms show a gold-colored drinking horn from the Middle Ages on a red background. It represents the historical importance of growing wheat and also the products of the modern Løiten Brænderi (Løten distillery).

Churches
The Church of Norway has one parish within the municipality of Løten. It is part of the Hamar domprosti (arch-deanery) in the Diocese of Hamar.

History
There has been traffic from east to west through Løten, throughout all recorded periods of history and archeological evidence supports earlier trade along this route. The old village center was formed around the Løten Church, which was built during the 13th century.

When King Christian IV of Denmark prohibited the importation of German beer in the early 17th Century, distillation began in Norway. In 1624, distilled alcohol was prohibited at weddings, and by 1638 King Christian forbade the clergy the right to distill in their own homes. The corn-growing districts of Løten, Vang (the former municipality in Hedmark), and Romedal all became famous for their distilleries. "Gamle Løiten" from Løiten Brænderi, which was established in 1855, was a highly prized "akvavit" produced in Løten.

When the railway was opened in 1862, Løten Station became the new centre of trade and management. The area around the new station grew up as the present village of Løten.

Government
All municipalities in Norway, including Løten, are responsible for primary education (through 10th grade), outpatient health services, senior citizen services, unemployment and other social services, zoning, economic development, and municipal roads. The municipality is governed by a municipal council of elected representatives, which in turn elects a mayor.  The municipality falls under the Østre Innlandet District Court and the Eidsivating Court of Appeal.

Municipal council
The municipal council  of Løten is made up of 17 representatives that are elected to four year terms. The party breakdown of the council is as follows:

Mayors
The mayors of Løten (incomplete list):
1980-1997: Even Østlund (Ap)
1997-1999: Bente Elin Lilleøkseth (Ap)
1999-2007: Martin Skramstad  (Sp)
2007-2019: Bente Elin Lilleøkseth (Ap)
2019–present: Marte Larsen Tønseth (Sp)

Geography

Løten lies in the eastern part of the traditional district of Hedmarken. It is surrounded by Hamar Municipality to the west-northwest, Stange municipality to the west-southwest, and Elverum municipality to the east. Small portions of the municipality border on Åmot in the far north and Våler in the south. The Hedmarksvidda moorland lies in the north.

Løten lies along the "border" between the agricultural wheat fields of the lower part of Eastern Norway (the areas around and south of lake Mjøsa), and the taiga (boreal coniferous forests) that stretch from eastern Norway all the way to Siberia. This border area between the cultivated farm land and the wilderness was written about by the poet Rolf Jacobsen, from Hamar, in his classic poem   (Thoughts at the Ånestad crossroad).

Notable residents

 Kristoffer Nilsen Svartbækken Grindalen (1804–1876) was the last person in Norway to be sentenced to death for murder. He committed murder in Løten, and was executed there.
 Edvard Munch (1863 in Ådalsbruk – 1944) a Norwegian painter of The Scream
 Helmer Hermansen (1871 in Løten – 1958) rifle shooter, team silver medallist at the 1900 Summer Olympics
 Marius Røhne (1883 in Løten – 1966) a Norwegian landscape architect
 Hallvard Trætteberg (1898 in Løten – 1987) a leading Norwegian heraldic artist
 Emil Løvlien (1899 in Løten - 1973) a Norwegian politician, leader of the Communist Party of Norway (1946-1965)
 Einar Johannessen (1926–2016) a Norwegian radio and TV personality, lived in Løten
 Magne Dæhli (born 1987 in Løten) a Norwegian orienteer, ski-orienteer and cross-country skier
 Monika Kørra (born 1989 in Løten) a Norwegian author and former track and field athlete

Gallery

References

External links

Municipal fact sheet from Statistics Norway 

 
Municipalities of Innlandet
1838 establishments in Norway